The Cowboys–Packers rivalry is a professional American football rivalry in the National Football League (NFL) between the Dallas Cowboys and the Green Bay Packers. The two teams do not play every year; instead, they play at least once every three years. Due to the NFL's scheduling rotation, all NFC East teams will battle all NFC North teams every third year. In addition, if the two teams finish in the same place in their respective divisions in any season, they will play each other the following season. The rivalry has also resulted in a number of notable games, including eight playoff games. CBS ranked this rivalry as the No. 3 NFL rivalry of the 1990s.

History
Although the rivalry has existed throughout the history of each team, it was most notable during two time periods. The first period occurred during late 1960s as both teams were highly successful prior to the AFL-NFL merger, which culminated in meeting in consecutive NFL Championship Games in 1966 and 1967. The 1967 meeting is eponymously called the "Ice Bowl", with the temperature at kick-off at -13 degrees. The Packers won the game on a late quarterback sneak by Bart Starr, which sent them to the Super Bowl. Each game ended in dramatic fashion in favor of the Packers, which lead to them winning the first two Super Bowls (Super Bowl I and II).  The Cowboys never defeated the Packers in the time Vince Lombardi was Packers head coach. 

The second period of notability occurred throughout the 1990s as both the Packers and Cowboys, alongside the San Francisco 49ers, were amongst the strongest teams in the NFC. The Packers and Cowboys met in the postseason three straight years from 1993 to 1995, with Dallas winning in each encounter, all of which were in Dallas. The Cowboys won two of their three Super Bowls in this period after defeating Green Bay in the postseason and won nine of ten meetings in the 90s. From 1992 to 1997, the Cowboys and Packers combined for five Super Bowl appearances and four Super Bowl championships. Additionally, the Packers won Super Bowl XLV in AT&T Stadium in 2011. Even during periods where one or both teams were not successful, the match-up was still consider a "storied championship rivalry".

During the Brett Favre era in Green Bay, the Cowboys dominated the rivalry, going 9–2 (including 9–0 in Dallas) against the Packers when Favre was the quarterback. However, since Aaron Rodgers became the Packers' starter in 2008, they have dominated the rivalry, as Rodgers has an 8–2 record against the Cowboys, including a perfect 3–0 record in Dallas. This includes the infamous Dez Caught It game in the 2014 playoffs. Late in the game quarterback Tony Romo completed what was initially called a catch on 4th down to wide receiver Dez Bryant near the goal line. After review though, the referees overturned the catch, saying that Bryant "did not complete the act of making the catch" after he bobbled the ball as he hit the ground. The Packers gained possession on the turnover on downs and ended up winning the game.

The two teams played their first overtime game in the series on November 13, 2022. The 3-6 Packers, riding a five-game losing streak, entered the game as 3.5-point underdogs to the 6-2 Cowboys, led by former Packers head coach Mike McCarthy in his return to Lambeau Field since getting fired by the Packers in 2018. After a scoreless first quarter, the two teams entered halftime tied at 14 after each team scored two touchdowns. The Cowboys would then score two more touchdowns in the third quarter to take a 28-14 lead heading into the fourth quarter. The Cowboys had never lost a game in franchise history when leading by 14 or more points in the fourth quarter, but two touchdown passes from Aaron Rodgers to rookie wide receiver Christian Watson allowed the Packers to tie the game and send it to overtime. After getting the ball first to start overtime, the Cowboys marched down to the Packers' 35-yard line and faced a fourth down with three yards to go, unsuccessfully going for it. On the Packers' ensuing drive, Rodgers completed a 36-yard throw to wide receiver Allen Lazard on third down and 1 to set up Mason Crosby's game-winning field goal.

As of the 2022 season, Green Bay is one of two NFC teams (along with the San Francisco 49ers) with a .500 or better record against the Cowboys. The Packers are also one of five teams, as well as the only NFC team, with a winning record against the Cowboys. The two teams have met eight times in the postseason, with each team winning four times.

Game results 

|-
| 
| style="| Packers  45–7
| Lambeau Field
| Packers  1–0
| Cowboys' inaugural season. This loss was the Cowboys' eighth of ten straight losses to start the season. Packers lose 1960 NFL Championship.
|-
| 
| style="| Packers   45–21
| Cotton Bowl
| Packers  2–0
|
|-
| 
| style="| Packers   13–3
| Milwaukee County Stadium
| Packers  3–0
| Packers win 1965 NFL Championship.
|-
! 1966 playoffs
! style="| Packers   34–27
! Cotton Bowl
! Packers  4–0
! NFL Championship Game. Packers win Super Bowl I.
|-
! 1967 playoffs
! style="| Packers   21–17
! Lambeau Field
! Packers  5–0
! NFL Championship Game, also known eponymously as the "Ice Bowl". Packers win Super Bowl II.
|-
| 
| style="| Packers  28–17
| Cotton Bowl
| Packers  6–0
|
|-

|-
| 
| style="| Cowboys  16–3
| Cotton Bowl
| Packers  6–1
| Cowboys' first victory of the series and the first on artificial turf. Last meeting at the Cotton Bowl, played on Thanksgiving. Cowboys won NFC title, but lost Super Bowl V.
|-
| 
| style="| Packers  16–13
| Milwaukee County Stadium
| Packers  7–1
|
|-
| 
| style="| Packers   19–17
| Texas Stadium
| Packers  8–1
| First meeting at Texas Stadium. Cowboys lose Super Bowl X.
|-
| 
| style="| Cowboys   42–14
| Milwaukee County Stadium
| Packers  8–2
| Cowboys lose Super Bowl XIII.
|-

|-
| 
| style="| Cowboys  28–7
| Milwaukee County Stadium
| Packers  8–3
|
|-
! 1982 playoffs
! style="| Cowboys  37–26
! Texas Stadium
! Packers  8–4
! NFC Second Round playoffs.
|-
| 
| style="| Cowboys  20–6
| Texas Stadium
| Packers  8–5
|
|-
| rowspan=2| 
| style="| Packers  31–13
| Lambeau Field
| rowspan=2| Packers  10–5
|
|-
| style="| Packers   20–10
| Texas Stadium
| Cowboys QB Troy Aikman makes first start against the Packers. Marked the only time both teams have met in the regular season twice.
|-

|-
| 
| style="| Cowboys  20–17
| Milwaukee County Stadium
| Packers  10–6
| Last meeting at Milwaukee County Stadium.
|-
| 
| style="| Cowboys  36–14
| Texas Stadium
| Packers  10–7
| Packers QB Brett Favre's first start against the Cowboys.
|-
! 1993 playoffs
! style="| Cowboys  27–17
! Texas Stadium
! Packers  10–8
! NFC Divisional Playoff. Cowboys win Super Bowl XXVIII.
|-
| 
| style="| Cowboys  42–31
| Texas Stadium
| Packers  10–9
| NFL Thanksgiving Day Game.  Jason Garrett starts for injured Troy Aikman.
|-
! 1994 playoffs
! style="| Cowboys  35–9
! Texas Stadium
! Tie  10–10
! NFC Divisional Playoff.
|-
| 
| style="| Cowboys  34–24
| Texas Stadium
| Cowboys  11–10
|
|-
! 1995 playoffs
! style="| Cowboys  38–27
! Texas Stadium
! Cowboys  12–10
! NFC Championship Game. Cowboys win Super Bowl XXX. Cowboys last NFC Championship Game appearance to date.
|-
| 
| style="| Cowboys   21–6
| Texas Stadium
| Cowboys  13–10
| Monday Night Football. Cowboys win 8 straight meetings. Packers win Super Bowl XXXI.  Chris Boniol sets team record with seven field goals. 
|-
| 
| style="| Packers   45–17
| Lambeau Field
| Cowboys  13–11
| Packers lose Super Bowl XXXII.
|-
| 
| style="| Cowboys   27–13
| Texas Stadium
| Cowboys  14–11
|
|-

|-
| 
| style="| Packers  41–20
| Lambeau Field
| Cowboys  14–12
|
|-
| 
| style="| Cowboys  37–27
| Texas Stadium
| Cowboys  15–12
| Thursday night meeting. Last meeting in Texas Stadium. Aaron Rodgers relieves Brett Favre.
|-
| 
| style="| Cowboys  27–16
| Lambeau Field
| Cowboys  16–12
| Packers' QB Aaron Rodgers' first start in the rivalry, and the Cowboys' first ever win at Lambeau Field.
|-
| 
| style="| Packers  17–7
| Lambeau Field
| Cowboys  16–13
|
|-

|-
| 
| style="| Packers  45–7
| Lambeau Field
| Cowboys  16–14
| Packers win Super Bowl XLV.
|-
| 
| style="| Packers  37–36
| AT&T Stadium
| Cowboys  16–15
| Packers come back from a 26–3 halftime deficit to win 37–36 behind 5 consecutive touchdown drives by backup QB Matt Flynn and the Packers' offense. Cowboys’ first home loss to the Packers since 1989.
|-
! 2014 playoffs
! style="| Packers  26–21
! Lambeau Field
! Tie  16–16
! NFC Divisional playoffs, known as the "Dez Caught It" game. Wide receiver Dez Bryant controversially had a 31-yard catch on fourth-and-2 overturned by referees, leading the Packers to a 26–21 win. Green Bay hands Dallas their only road defeat of the season.
|-
| 
| style="| Packers  28–7
| Lambeau Field
| Packers  17–16
|
|-
| 
| style="| Cowboys  30–16
| Lambeau Field
| Tie  17–17
| Cowboys QB Dak Prescott's first start in the rivalry.
|-
! 2016 playoffs
! style="| Packers  34–31
! AT&T Stadium
! Packers  18–17
! NFC Divisional playoffs, Packers win on game-winning 51-yard field goal by Mason Crosby as time expires after Jared Cook caught a 36-yard pass from Aaron Rodgers on third-and-20 from the Green Bay 32-yard line.
|-
| 
| style="| Packers  35–31
| AT&T Stadium
| Packers  19–17
| Aaron Rodgers throws the game-winning touchdown pass to Davante Adams with 11 seconds remaining.
|-
|-
| 
| style="| Packers  34–24
| AT&T Stadium
| Packers  20–17
| Aaron Jones ties a Packers franchise record with 4 rushing touchdowns.
|-

|-
|
| style="| Packers  31–28 (OT)
| Lambeau Field
| Packers  21–17
| Marks the return of Coach Mike McCarthy to Lambeau Field. This is the first game in the series that went to overtime.
|-

|-
| Regular season
| style="|
| 
| 
| The "at Green Bay Packers" column includes five games played in Milwaukee, in which the Cowboys were 3–2
|-
| Postseason
| Tie 4–4
| Cowboys 4–2
| Packers 2–0
| NFC Divisional/ Second Round playoffs: 1982, 1993–94, 2014, 2016. NFC Championship Game: 1995. NFL Championship Game: 1966–67.
|-
| Regular and postseason
| style="|
| 
| 
| 
|-

See also

 National Football League rivalries

References

National Football League rivalries
Dallas Cowboys
Green Bay Packers rivalries
Dallas Cowboys rivalries